McCoy, Texas may refer to the following unincorporated communities:

McCoy, Atascosa County, Texas
McCoy, Kaufman County, Texas